Sullivan Lake  is a lake in Halifax Regional Municipality, Nova Scotia, Canada. The primary outflow is an unnamed creek to Bennery Lake that flows via Bennery Brook and the Shubenacadie River to Cobequid Bay on the Minas Basin, part of the Bay of Fundy.

See also
List of lakes in Nova Scotia

References

Lakes of Nova Scotia